Love Songs is a compilation album by American singer Tina Turner, released on February 3, 2014, by Parlophone. The album is a collection of eighteen of Turner's greatest love songs, and spans more than three decades.

Track listing

Charts

Weekly charts

Year-end charts

References

2014 compilation albums
Parlophone compilation albums
Tina Turner compilation albums